Francisco Suriano (born 21 July 1978) is an Olympic breaststroke swimmer from El Salvador. He swam for El Salvador at the:
Olympics: 1996, 2000
World Championships: 1998, 2003
Pan American Games: 2003
Central American & Caribbean Games: 1998, 2002

References

1978 births
Living people
Salvadoran male swimmers
Male breaststroke swimmers
Olympic swimmers of El Salvador
Swimmers at the 1996 Summer Olympics
Swimmers at the 2000 Summer Olympics
Swimmers at the 2003 Pan American Games
Pan American Games competitors for El Salvador
Central American and Caribbean Games gold medalists for El Salvador
Competitors at the 1998 Central American and Caribbean Games
Competitors at the 2002 Central American and Caribbean Games
Central American and Caribbean Games medalists in swimming